The Xiaomi Mi 9 Pro 5G is a flagship Android smartphone developed by Xiaomi. It was announced in September 2019 as an upgraded version of the Mi 9.

Specifications

Design
The Xiaomi Mi 9 Pro 5G is similar to the Mi 9 externally, with Gorilla Glass 6 on both the front and rear and a 7000 series aluminum frame. It is available in Dream White or Titanium Black.

Hardware
The Xiaomi Mi 9 Pro 5G is powered by the Qualcomm Snapdragon 855+ SoC, with 8GB or 12GB of LPDDR4X RAM and the Adreno 640 GPU. Storage options include 128 GB, 256GB or 512GB. The display remains the same, with a 6.39-inch (162.3 mm) 1080p (1080 × 2340) AMOLED panel and an 85.5% screen-to-body ratio. The battery is larger at 4000 mAh, and supports 40W fast charging over USB-C with 30W fast wireless charging. It can also charge other Qi-compatible smartphones at 10W. The under-display optical fingerprint sensor is carried over from the Mi 9.
The cameras are unchanged as well, with a 48 MP main camera, a 12 MP telephoto lens with 2x optical zoom and a 16 MP ultrawide lens at the rear, with a 20 MP front camera.

Software
It runs on Android 10, with Xiaomi's custom MIUI 11 skin.

References 

Android (operating system) devices
Xiaomi smartphones
Mobile phones introduced in 2019
Mobile phones with multiple rear cameras
Mobile phones with 4K video recording
Mobile phones with infrared transmitter
Discontinued smartphones